Riesa is a town in the district of Meißen in Saxony, Germany.

History

The name Riesa is derived from Slavic Riezowe. This name, romanised as "Rezoa", appears first in October 1119 in a document from Pope Callixtus II.

The world's first 110 kV power line was installed between Riesa and Lauchhammer in 1912. Between 1952 and 1994, Riesa was the seat of a district.

During the 1980s, Riesa was the headquarters of the Group of Soviet Forces in Germany's 9th Tank Division.

Population history
The town grew from the start of the 20th century due to industrialisation. The population declined after German Reunification in 1989. The local steel works shut and the population fell from 52,000 to 31,000.

Sights

Riesa has a 25 m tall, 234 tonne, cast-iron (GGG 40) sculpture of an oak trunk, named Elbquelle, which means source of the Elbe,  by Jörg Immendorff, erected in 1999. Local folk call the sculpture by many other names, most notably "Rostige Eiche", which means "Rusty Oak".

In Riesa there are two notable churches. The minster St. Marien was built in 1261 as an addition to the Benedictine Abbey. The Trinitatis Church was completed in 1897.

Culture
Riesa is well known locally for its pasta, which is produced at Teigwaren Riesa GmbH. Another symbol of Riesa are the Riesaer Zündhölzer, the matches which were traditionally manufactured there.

The steel production in Riesa is also well known.

Sport
Riesa has a football club, BSG Stahl Riesa. The club's crest is blue and white, as are the club colours. They play now in the Landesliga Sachsen (6th tier).

Riesa is known locally for the SACHSENarena, a large hall which hosted the European Sumo Wrestling Championship in October 2003 and the World Sumo Wrestling Championship in October 2004.

Twin towns – sister cities

Riesa is twinned with:

 Głogów, Poland
 Lonato del Garda, Italy
 Mannheim, Germany
 Rotherham, England, United Kingdom
 Sandy, United States
 Villerupt, France
 Wuzhong (Suzhou), China

Transport

Riesa railway station is located north of the town's centre, it offers both regional and long-distance services.

Riesa is located on Bundesstraße 169, which ensures access to federal motorways A 14 (close to Döbeln, approx. 25 km) and A 13 (close to Ruhland, approx. 50 km).

Notable people

Adolph von Carlowitz (1858–1928), Saxon officer, general of the infantry and war minister
Johannes Müller (1864–1949), theologian
Rolf Moebius (1915–2004), actor
Dieter Noll (1927–2008), writer
Jürgen Schmieder (born 1952), politician
Monika Zehrt (born 1952), athlete
Heiko Peschke (born 1963), footballer
Ulf Kirsten (born 1965), footballer
Rüdiger Heinze (born 1971), film producer and screenwriter
Maximilian Arnold (born 1994), footballer

Associated with the town
Walter Fritzsch (1920–1997), football coach
Wolfgang Lischke (born 1947), footballer
Peter Kotte (born 1954), footballer
Harald Czudaj (born 1963), bobsledder
Ralf Hauptmann (born 1968), footballer

References

External links
Official website
Riesa tourism site
Official Web site of Stahl Riesa Footballclub

 
Meissen (district)
Populated riverside places in Germany
Populated places on the Elbe